Quebradillas is a town and municipality of the island of Puerto Rico located in the north-western shore bordering the Atlantic Ocean, north of San Sebastián; east of Isabela; and west of Camuy. Quebradillas is spread over seven barrios and Quebradillas Pueblo (the downtown area and the administrative center of the city). It is part of the San Juan-Caguas-Guaynabo Metropolitan Statistical Area.

Quebradillas is called "La Guarida del Pirata" (The Pirate's Hideout). A well-known beach in the area, Puerto Hermina, is home to an old structure known to have been a hiding place for pirates and their contraband.

History
The town was founded in 1823 by Felipe Ruiz.  There were many factors that cause the inhabitants of this territory of Puerto Rico to be independent from the towns that formed the Hato de la Tuna resulting in the formation of a new municipality. The town lacked chapels or churches, religious services nor priests, a place to bury the dead, a post office, and quality roads to transport. They relied on the neighboring municipalities of Camuy, Hatillo and Isabela. This would however be a problem during the rainy seasons when the Río Camuy and Río Guajataca water level rose resulting in closed off passage to the other municipalities and would sometimes take up to a week for the water level to return to normal. This led the residents of the area to organize a corporation that would look after the political, economic and administrative interests of "Las Quebradillas" and its jurisdiction. This town derives its name from the large number of streams flowing through it. Quebradillas means "small streams".

Puerto Rico was ceded by Spain in the aftermath of the Spanish–American War under the terms of the Treaty of Paris of 1898 and became a territory of the United States.  In 1899, the United States Department of War conducted a census of Puerto Rico finding that the population of Quebradillas was 7,432.

On September 20, 2017 Hurricane Maria struck the island of Puerto Rico.  In Quebradillas, 800 concrete barriers had to be built to stabilize the Guajataca reservoir which suffered a structural failure and was causing a "life-threatening situation". "It’s a structural failure. I don’t have any more details," Governor Ricardo Rosselló stated. "We’re trying to evacuate as many people as possible." Rosselló ordered the Puerto Rico National Guard and the Police to help assist in the evacuation effort downstream. The dam lies across the Guajataca River to form a reservoir that can hold roughly 11 billion gallons of water. 

In Quebradillas, infrastructure and about 2200 homes were damaged or completely destroyed.

Geography

Quebradillas, located in the Northern Karst, borders on the Atlantic Ocean, is north of San Sebastián; east of Isabela, and west of Camuy. Quebradillas is home to one of the 20 designated forest preserves in Puerto Rico, the Guajataca State Forest. The forest serves as a great example of an unusual topography known as karst country. Karst is characterized by dissolved limestone formations such as sinkholes and haystack-shaped hills known as "mogotes". It is also home to the beautiful man-made reservoir, Guajataca Lake ( long), where you can fish for largemouth bass, peacock bass, tilapia and bluegill (in Spanish known as "chopa"). You can also go hiking or camping. The Puerto Rico Council of the Boy Scouts of America maintains a campground on the lake known as Camp Guajataka. The name Guajataca comes from the name Wahataka, a Taíno chief who lived in this area. This Indian chief also gives his name to Guajataca Beach to the north where Río Guajataca flowing from Guajataca Lake meets the Atlantic Ocean. Guajataca Beach is popular with surfers and is known for its white sands and wild waves. This beach is ideal for sunning and collecting seashells.

Barrios

Like all municipalities of Puerto Rico, Quebradillas is subdivided into barrios.
Cacao
Charcas
Cocos
Guajataca
Quebradillas barrio-pueblo
San Antonio
San José
Terranova

Sectors

Barrios (which are like minor civil divisions) in turn are further subdivided into smaller local populated place areas/units called sectores (sectors in English). The types of sectores may vary, from normally sector to urbanización to reparto to barriada to residencial, among others.

Special Communities

 (Special Communities of Puerto Rico) are marginalized communities whose citizens are experiencing a certain amount of social exclusion. A map shows these communities occur in nearly every municipality of the commonwealth. Of the 742 places that were on the list in 2014, the following barrios, communities, sectors, or neighborhoods were in Quebradillas: Guajataca, Montadero, Parcelas Italas in Terranova, San Antonio, and Sector Las Piedras Barrio Cocos.

Climate 
The general climate of the town is tropical.

Demographics

Tourism

Landmarks and places of interest

There are 6 beaches in Quebradillas.

The town of Quebradillas had a private zoo called  (Noah's Ark), which was in operation for about 50 years. In 2012 it was closed after its owners where 90 years old and could no longer care for the animals, as a result they were moved to the Dr. Juan A. Rivero Zoo. The town also had El Museo de Muñecas (Quebradillas Doll Museum) which housed over 1,000 Barbie dolls in Cocos.

The main attractions of Quebradillas are:
El Merendero (Scenic Park and Ocean Look-Out)
Miradero Guajataca
Guajataca Lake Reservoir
The Liberty Theater (downtown)
Puerto Hermina Beach Pirate Ruins contains rock carvings such as La Cabeza del Indio (The Indian Face)
Puente Blanco (an old railway bridge)
Casa Rafols-Iribas, site of Casa de la Cultura Cacique Mabodamaca (non-profit organization dedicated to preserve the culture, the arts and the historical sites of the town of Quebradillas)
Los Chorritos Pirata Aquatic Park
The municipal mini golf course

Economy

Business
A small shopping center called Quebradillas Plaza is located in this municipality.

An event which negatively affected the region in the decade of the 1990s was the disappearance of tax exemptions to the private corporations Section 936 of the code of the US Internal Revenue Service , which at the time was the resulted in the closure of one of the greater manufacturers of textiles in the northwest area of the island. This decline of the industry of the needle occurred similarly in the bordering cities like Isabela and Camuy, generating a regional economic decline as the locals greatly depended on these jobs. In nearby towns like Hatillo, Mayagüez and Aguadilla, the arrival of mega stores and new shopping centers attracted the jobs that used to be in Quebradillas.

The island lacks mass public transportation, people must resort to private cars. The only road to access the important cities, the Puerto Rico Highway 2 suffers from congestion. The town possesses one tunnel that at the beginning of the 20th century was used by steam driven trains that traveled throughout the Island. This absence aggravates the problem of mass transit and the dependence on privately owned vehicles as these are the only method of transportation.

The economy, entering into the 21st century, is based on retail sales. Many small businesses are located along the two main thoroughfares that cross Quebradillas. These consist mainly of light hardware, bakeries, pharmacies, seafood restaurants, American fast food chains and automobile car repair shops.

The town has bank branches for Banco Popular and local savings and credit Unions. These credit unions are most noted for their involvement in common and cultural activities, sponsoring and participating in festivals of typical music such as "Festival of the Gourd in December", sports and educational activities.

Culture

Festivals and events
Quebradillas celebrates its patron saint festival in October. The  is a religious and cultural celebration that generally features parades, games, artisans, amusement rides, regional food, and live entertainment.

Other festivals and events celebrated in Quebradillas include:
 Wake of the Three Kings – January
 Kite Festival – February
 Guajataca Carnival – January/February
 Serenade to Mothers – May
 Serenade to Fathers – June
 Quebradillas Cultural Festival – December

Sports
The town's official basketball team is Los Piratas' who have won a dramatic number of tournaments in the past. Presently the team has made a "comeback" and has won the championship of the island (2013).
Basketball teams
Surfing – Guajataca Beach and Puerto Hermina (Pirates Cove)
Skateboarding – San Jose Skatepark
Baseball – Los Cocos Park
Longboarding

Government
The town's government is a small unit with few powers it can execute. Elections are hosted in specific schools every four years to choose a town mayor. 

There are several versions detailing different individuals who have served as mayor. An official promotional booklet details 46, while another source states 47. It has also been asserted that a woman, Francisca Lamela de Cordero, served between 1944–1945, in a source that presents 56 incumbents, however she is not included in the municipal-approved list, which expresses that since its founding the town has elected 61 mayors:

Transportation
There are 4 bridges in Quebradillas.

Symbols
The  has an official flag and coat of arms.

Flag
It has two red quarters. The red stands for struggle, effort and sacrifice. The other two-quarters have each five green and white wavy stripes, similar to those that appear in the shield.

Coat of arms
The three waved stripes represent the quebradillas (Spanish for creeks or streams), over the green background of the vegetation. The fish and the walking stick (distinctive of the traveler), are insignias of the angel Saint Raphael, by allusion from the episodes narrated in the Book of Tobias in the Old Testament.

Education
The town features various public and private schools. There is also a public electronic library near Los Chorritos Pirata water park. In 2021 the municipal government opened a child daycare center. Some schools have been remodeled as a result of a government initiative to have "21st century" schools.

Schools
Manuel Ramos Hernandez 
Juan Alejo de Arizmendi
Eugenio Maria De Hostos
Luis Muñoz Rivera
Honorio Hernandez
Pedro Albizu Campos
Ramon E. Betances
Ramon Avila Molinari
Ramon Saavedra
Jose De Diego
Private schools:

 Colegio San Rafael
 Soles del Jardín
 Pequeños Aprendiendo

Gallery

See also

 Quebradillas Limestone—limestone rock formation in area.
 
 Did you know—Puerto Rico?

References

External links
 Lexjuris
 Quebradillas Municipality on Facebook
 Puerto Rico Government Directory – Quebradillas

Municipalities of Puerto Rico
Populated coastal places in Puerto Rico
San Juan–Caguas–Guaynabo metropolitan area
Populated places established in 1823
1823 establishments in the Spanish Empire
1820s establishments in Puerto Rico